Japanzine is a Japan-based English-language magazine, published by Carter Witt Media. Now 20 years in publication, it is the successor magazine to The Alien and caters largely to the expatriate community in Japan. Each edition of the magazine contains a map of various Japanese cities and an entertainment guide, as well as several articles - both satirical and serious - on Japanese life. The comic strip character Charisma Man first appeared in The Alien and later in Japanzine.

The magazine provided a regular gig guide for music lovers in Tokyo with a mix of international and up and coming local artists. In May 2008 the magazine introduced Gaijin Sounds, a national music competition for foreign artists residing in Japan, created as an attempt to counteract the lack of press coverage given to "home-grown" artists. Twelve artists from around Japan were selected as winners with music ranging from techno to indie-pop to rap. The popularity of the contest meant another competition, Gaijin Sounds Vol. 2, was launched the following year, featuring in the May 2009 issue. The competition soon expanded to the live arena, with 2 live "finals" in Osaka and Tokyo in autumn 2009, featuring over 8 bands such as Fukuoka outfit, Nanbanjin; Tokyo-based Kev Gray & The Gravy Train - both who had won the award twice - and the former Matsuyama indie rock band The Watanabes, also based in Tokyo.

The competition returned in 2010, where winners included Andy Tyrone Rogers and The Mootekkis, who featured on the cover.

In 2012, Japanzine opened up the competition to all-Japanese line-ups with a national Bands of Japan contest.

References

External links

 
 

1990 establishments in Japan
Magazines published in Japan
Monthly magazines published in Japan
English-language magazines
Magazines established in 1990
News magazines published in Asia
Local interest magazines